C.T. James Huang (born 1948) is a Taiwanese-American linguist. He is a professor of linguistics at Harvard University.

Huang was born in a small township of Fuli, Hualien, in Taiwan. He received his B.A. and M.A. degrees from National Taiwan Normal University in 1971 and 1974, respectively, and in 1982 earned a Ph.D. in linguistics from the Massachusetts Institute of Technology. He received the Linguistic Society of Taiwan's Lifetime Achievement award in 2014 and was elected a Fellow of the Linguistic Society of America in 2015. In 2016, he was elected an Academician in the Convocation of the Academia Sinica's division of Humanities and Social Sciences. In 2019 he was elected a Member of Academia Europaea (The Academy of Europe). 

Huang has published articles and books in both English in Mandarin Chinese within the generative grammar framework of linguistics, extensively on the structure of Mandarin Chinese grammar. His influence in the field is widely credited for "paving the way and leading the development of Chinese theoretical syntax"; "without his pioneering research [...] such a field would not exist in the rich way we presently know it". In 2009, Huang collaborated with Y.-H. Audrey Li and Yafei Li to co-author a Cambridge Syntax Guide spanning the work of the past 25 years in theoretical Chinese syntax. In 2015, Huang received a Festschrift comprising the work of 21 specialists in Chinese syntax, which is headlined by his own most recent publication on the subject of both synchronic and diachronic approaches to syntactic analyticity in Chinese parametric grammar.

Books

References

External links
 Homepage
 Faculty Webpage @ Harvard
 Linguist List 'Famous Linguists' Autobiographical

Living people
Generative linguistics
Syntacticians
Linguists from Taiwan
Harvard University faculty
1948 births
National Taiwan Normal University alumni
MIT School of Humanities, Arts, and Social Sciences alumni
Fellows of the Linguistic Society of America
Linguists from the United States